Wise Sons Jewish Delicatessen is a San Francisco-based chain of Jewish delis and bagel shops with 9 locations throughout the San Francisco Bay and in Culver City in the Los Angeles Areas in California, and Japan.

Overview

Wise Sons serves various foods from Jewish cuisine, such as pastrami, bagels, corned beef, Reuben sandwiches, and more.

History

2002-2015
Wise Sons Jewish Delicatessen was founded by brothers Evan & Ari Bloom and their friend Leo Beckerman at 22nd and Mission Street in the Mission District neighborhood of San Francisco, California.

2015-2020
On January 27, 2015, a fire broke out in the 2588 Mission Street building on the corner of 22nd and Mission. This was the deli chain's flagship location, and housed its commissary kitchen inside which served their other locations. Wise Sons had been planning to launch a new line of bagels baked on-site that same week, complete with a small to-go window that had been constructed in a 100-square-foot space in the building. The fire killed a 38-year old man, and destroyed the homes of 54 people as well as numerous businesses besides Wise Sons including Mission Market, taquerias, and a Popeyes. The subsequent water damage from firefighting efforts also devastated the company's central office that has been located in the building, destroying computers, files, and all of their equipment for their annual booth at the Outside Lands festival.

Due to the fire destroying their commissary kitchen, Bloom was looking for a new 2000-4000 sq ft space to use, but temporarily the 24th Street location handled smoking meats such as pastrami and making sauces such as Russian dressing, while the Contemporary Jewish Museum location baked challah and bialys in the evening hours. For the first time rye bread was sourced from an outside supplier.

2020- present
In the spring of 2020, business was down by 50%, their bagel shop at the Marin Country Mart was temporarily closed, several executives were fired, and their catering business had declined due to the COVID-19 pandemic. Wise Sons launched a delivery-only ghost kitchen concept out of their location at the Contemporary Jewish Museum called Lev, serving Israeli food such as chicken shawarma, falafel, Impossible Kefta meatballs over turmeric rice, fries dressed in a harissa with herby yogurt dip, and Israeli salad. The name of the restaurant is derived from the Levant region, the western region of Asia where Israel is located. This Wise Sons first venture that does not serve Ashkenazi Jewish cuisine, instead serving Sephardic and Israeli cuisine. Lev had been in development for several years prior as a catering company, and in 2018 Lev opened a permanent food stand in Square's Market Street headquarters. Wise Sons opened their first location in the Los Angeles Area, in August 2021 with the opening of their downtown Culver City location in the former Amacita space directly adjacent to Amazon Studios and HBO's headquarters. This location had been under development since at least March 2021.

Locations
There are currently ten locations, 9 of which are located in Northern California, and 1 of which is located in Tokyo, Japan.

Los Angeles expansion

In July 2019, it was reported that Wise Sons was considering expanding to Los Angeles and opening their first Southern California location in the building that formerly housed Lenny's Deli in West Los Angeles. Building owner Lenny Rosenberg said of the potential sale, “I had a management company in there for few years that did not do a proper job so I decided to flip it/sell to Wise Sons.” 

In a statement Wise Sons said, “We do not currently have a completed agreement with the Landlord on leasing the space, nor is Lenny ‘flipping’ anything to us. Negotiations are ongoing at this time.” Wise Sons expanded their operations  to Southern California in August 2021.

See also

 List of Jewish delis

References

External links

1927 establishments in the United States
Companies based in San Francisco
Restaurants in Tokyo
Jewish delicatessens in the United States
Jews and Judaism in San Francisco
Cuisine of the Western United States
Jews and Judaism in California
Restaurants established in 1927
Restaurants in San Francisco